A fallen angel is an angel who has been exiled or banished from Heaven.

Fallen Angels may also refer to:

Film and television
 Fallen Angels (1948 film), a Greek film by Nikos Tsiforos
 Fallen Angels (1985 documentary film) by Gregory Dark
 Fallen Angels (1995 film), a Hong Kong film by Wong Kar-wai
 Fallen Angels (2006 film), a horror film featuring Adrianne Curry
 Fallen Angels (2008 film), a film by Morten Tyldum
 Fallen Angels (American TV series), a 1993–1995 American neo-noir anthology series that was broadcast on Showtime
 Fallen Angels (Australian TV series), a 1997 Australian drama series

Literature
 Fallen Angels (play), a 1925 play by Noël Coward
 Fallen Angels: Six Noir Tales Told for Television, a 1993 anthology
 Fallen Angels (comics), a fictional team of superhuman teenagers in the Marvel Comics universe

Novels
 Fallen Angels (Myers novel), a 1988 novel by Walter Dean Myers
 Fallen Angels (Niven, Pournelle, and Flynn novel), a 1991 novel by Larry Niven, Jerry Pournelle, and Michael Flynn
 Fallen Angels, a novel by Susannah Kells
 Fallen Angels, a book by Mike Lee in the Horus Heresy series

Music

Bands
 Phil May & the Fallen Angels
 Sonic Syndicate, formerly Fallen Angels, a Swedish metal band
 Fallen Angels, a 1970s U.S. band fronted by Gram Parsons and including Emmylou Harris
 Fallen Angels, a 1980s UK band founded by Knox

Albums
 Fallen Angels (Bob Dylan album) (2016)
 Fallen Angels (Fallen Angels album) (1984)
 Fallen Angels (Venom album) (2011)

Songs
 "Fallen Angels" (Black Veil Brides song), 2011
Fallen Angels (Ra song), 2005
 "Fallen Angels", a 1997 song by Aerosmith from Nine Lives
 "Fallen Angels", a song by Deceptikonz from Elimination
 "Fallen Angels", a song by Dio from Sacred Heart
 "Fallen Angels", a 1985 song by Sheena Easton from A Private Heaven
 "Fallen Angels", a song by Edguy from Mandrake
 "Fallen Angels", a 1992 song by Buffy Sainte-Marie
”Fallen Angels”, a 1997 song by Aerosmith from Nine Lives (album)

Other uses
 The Fallen Angels (video game), a 1998 computer arcade fighting game
 Fallen Angels, an artwork by Patrick Woodroffe used on the cover of the Judas Priest album Sad Wings of Destiny

See also
 Fallen angel (disambiguation)
 Angel of Darkness (disambiguation)
 Angels Fall (disambiguation)
 Dark Angel (disambiguation)
 Evil Angel (disambiguation)
 Falling Angels (disambiguation)
 The Fall of Angels, a novel in The Saga of Recluce series by L. E. Modesitt, Jr.
 
 :Category:Fallen angels